The Sophia of Jesus Christ is a Gnostic text that was first discovered in the Berlin Codex (a Codex purchased in Cairo in 1896 and given to the Berlin Museum which also contains the Gospel of Mary, the Apocryphon of John, and a summary of the Act of Peter). More famously, the Sophia of Jesus Christ is also among the many Gnostic tractates in the Nag Hammadi codices, discovered in Egypt in 1945. The Berlin-Codex manuscript (as opposed to its contents) probably dates to c. AD 400, and the Nag-Hammadi manuscript has been dated to the 300s. However, these are complemented by a few fragments in Greek dating from the 200s, indicating an earlier date for the contents. The text has strong similarities to the Epistle of Eugnostos, which is also found in the Nag Hammadi codices, but with a Christian framing added, and expanding it somewhat.

Background
The debate about dating is critical, since some argue that it reflects the "true, recorded, sayings" of Jesus, which is possible if they were to be dated as far back as the 1st century. Others argue that they are, in fact, considerably later, and constitute an unreliable secondary source (at best post factum hearsay).

Most scholars argue that the text is of Gnostic origin, based on the similarities between the mystical teachings found in the text itself and standard Gnostic themes. Highly mystical, the content of this text concerns creation of gods, angels, and the universe with an emphasis on infinite and metaphysical truth. 

The text is composed of 13 questions from the disciples, followed by brief discourses by Jesus in response. 
The first question concerns the vanity and futility of searching for God.
The second concerns how to find truth, but only explaining what it is not.
The third concerns how truth was revealed to the gnostics at the beginning of time.
The fourth concerns how one must awake to see the truth.
The fifth concerns how things began.
The sixth concerns how mankind came to gnosis.
The seventh concerns the position of Jesus in all this.
The eighth concerns the identity of Jesus.
The ninth concerns how the spirit connects to the material.
The tenth concerns the number of spirits.
The eleventh concerns the immortal.
The twelfth concerns those who are not material.
The final question concerns where mankind came from and what purpose it should have.

References

External links
 The Sophia of Jesus Christ, translation by Douglas M. Parrott, at the Gnosis Archive
 PBS Article

Gnostic apocrypha
Nag Hammadi library